Demba Savage (born 17 June 1988) is a Gambian professional footballer who plays as a midfielder for Finnish club TPS. A right winger, who can also operate on the left wing or as a striker, he is mostly known for his blazing speed and dribbling skills.

Career

Club
Savage started playing football on the streets of Banjul as a boy. In his school, Saint Mary's, he became a star player. After finishing secondary school, he played for Warriors FC and Rico FC. In 2003, he signed for Gambia Ports Authority F.C. In the 2003–2004 season, he was the top goalscorer in the league with GPA F.C.

In 2006, he signed for Finnish second tier club KPV. In his first season, he mostly played with KPV's reserve team, but in 2007, he took his place in the first team.

In August 2008, he was loaned to the Finnish Premier Division side FC Honka. Honka used its option for a permanent move after the season.

On 7 February 2012 the reigning Finnish champions, HJK, announced that they had signed Savage along with teammate Rasmus Schüller. Qualified for the Europa League group stages 2014 with HJK with a 5–4 aggregate victory over SK Rapid Wien.

On 28 October 2015, Savage signed for Swedish Allsvenskan side BK Häcken, following HJK teammate Rasmus Schüller who had signed for BK Häcken earlier in the month.

On 27 February 2017, Savage returned to HJK on a two-year contract.

On 1 April 2022, Savage joined TPS on a one-year deal.

International
In June 2008, Savage debuted in Gambia's national team in a World Cup qualification match against Liberia. He has also played in Gambia's youth national teams.

Career statistics

Club

References

External links

 Player profile on KPV website
 
 The Observer.gm: Star Profile: Demba Savage

1988 births
Living people
Sportspeople from Banjul
Gambian footballers
Association football wingers
Gambia Ports Authority FC players
Kokkolan Palloveikot players
FC Honka players
Helsingin Jalkapalloklubi players
BK Häcken players
Erzurumspor footballers
Turun Palloseura footballers
Veikkausliiga players
Allsvenskan players
The Gambia international footballers
Gambian expatriate footballers
Gambian expatriate sportspeople in Finland
Expatriate footballers in Finland
Gambian expatriate sportspeople in Sweden
Expatriate footballers in Sweden
Gambian expatriate sportspeople in Turkey
Expatriate footballers in Turkey